Aminabad (also Romanized as Amīnābād) is a village in Ahmadabad Rural District, in the Central District of Firuzabad County, Fars Province, Iran. At the 2006 census, its population was 466, in 95 families.

References 

Populated places in Firuzabad County